Lost City is an unincorporated community and census-designated place (CDP) in Cherokee County, Oklahoma, United States. The population was 770 at the 2010 census, a 4.8 percent decline from the figure of 809 recorded in 2000. It was the site of the first meteorite fall in the US to be recorded by a camera network.

Geography
Lost City is located north of State Highway 51 and northwest of the city of Tahlequah in northeast Oklahoma. The city is part of "Green Country", a region of the state characterized by green vegetation and numerous lakes, including Fort Gibson Lake, which lies west of Lost City.

Lost City's geographic coordinates are   (35.985954, -95.123886).

Demographics
As of the census of 2000, there were 809 people, 279 households, and 234 families residing in the CDP. The population density was 34.7 people per square mile (13.4/km2). There were 308 housing units at an average density of 13.2/sq mi (5.1/km2). The racial makeup of the CDP was 55.13% White, 38.07% Native American, 0.49% Asian, 1.11% from other races, and 5.19% from two or more races. Hispanic or Latino of any race were 1.11% of the population.

There were 279 households, out of which 41.2% had children under the age of 18 living with them, 67.4% were married couples living together, 11.5% had a female householder with no husband present, and 16.1% were non-families. 13.6% of all households were made up of individuals, and 5.4% had someone living alone who was 65 years of age or older. The average household size was 2.90 and the average family size was 3.17.

In the CDP, the population was spread out, with 30.4% under the age of 18, 7.9% from 18 to 24, 27.1% from 25 to 44, 25.6% from 45 to 64, and 9.0% who were 65 years of age or older. The median age was 35 years. For every 100 females, there were 102.8 males. For every 100 females age 18 and over, there were 97.5 males.

The median income for a household in the CDP was $29,118, and the median income for a family was $31,932. Males had a median income of $27,566 versus $20,357 for females. The per capita income for the CDP was $11,629. About 16.7% of families and 15.4% of the population were below the poverty line, including 11.7% of those under age 18 and 25.6% of those age 65 or over.

Meteorite fall of 3 January 1970

On January 3, 1970, four stations (Hominy OK, Woodward OK, Pleasanton KS, and Garden City KS) of the Prairie Meteorite Network simultaneously photographed the track of a meteoroid fireball. (The fireball was visible for approximately nine seconds. It was accompanied with a sonic boom.) Analysis of the photographs indicated that a meteorite might have landed within an area east of Lost City. This was the first time in the US that simultaneous photography of a fireball from multiple observation points was achieved, making it possible to calculate a trajectory and delimit a search area on the ground.  Six days later Gunther Schwartz, a field manager for the network, went to the Lost City school to ask questions to see if anyone had seen or heard anything about it, at that time a maintenance man and bus driver by the name of Isaac Gifford told the scientist he had seen it while he was raccoon hunting. Gifford took Schwartz to the spot where he had seen the meteorite in the air close to where he was hunting, they walked to the location and soon discovered the meteorite. "Suddenly there was the black rock in the road, and I wondered what it was doing there, and got out to look at it," Schwartz said. "And then you get hysterical. Just think of the odds against finding it there. Fantastic."

Three additional smaller meteorite fragments were recovered later: on January 17, a fragment weighing 272 grams; on February 2, one weighing 6.6 kilograms; and on May 4, one weighing 640 grams within one-half mile of Lost City. The Lost City meteorite proved to be an H5 chondrite.

The photos that were taken by the Smithsonian Astrophysical Observatory enabled scientists to reconstruct the meteorites orbit...concluding that it originated somewhere in the asteroid belt.

References

Bibliography
 The Daily Oklahoman, January 14, 1970. Oklahoma City: Oklahoma Publishing Company.
 Lost City. The Meteoritical Society, 27 Nov 2006. (accessed February 3, 2007)

Census-designated places in Cherokee County, Oklahoma
Census-designated places in Oklahoma
Cherokee towns in Oklahoma